Ultralife is the second album by alt-pop duo Oh Wonder, released on 14 July 2017.

Background 
Anthony West and Josephine Vander Gucht of Oh Wonder began the writing process with a month in an Airbnb in Brooklyn, New York in April 2016. Later in the year, they returned to their hometown of London after a year of touring the world, and wrote the second half of the record. The twelve songs were recorded over a 10-day period at The Pool Studio, Bermondsey in December 2016 and finished at their home studio at the start of 2017. The duo wrote, recorded, produced and mixed the record themselves. The first single "Ultralife" was released on 31 March 2017 and hailed by the NME as "bright-eyed" and "dazzling".

Critical reception 

Ultralife received positive reviews from critics. Larisha Paul of Baeble Music called the album an "ethereal adventure" that showcases the duo's "masterful songwriting abilities". In contrast, AllMusic's Marcy Donelson said that, compared to their 2015 debut album, "intimacy definitely takes a hit with Ultralife's expanded production".

Track listing

Charts

References

2017 albums
Oh Wonder albums
Island Records albums
Republic Records albums